Yamburg is a rural locality (a settlement) in Nadymsky District of Yamalo-Nenets Autonomous Okrug of Russia,  north of the Arctic Circle on the Gulf of Ob.

The name of the settlement is derived from the Yamburg gas field, which was discovered in 1969. Yamburg was constructed in the early 1980s as the base of operations for the exploration and development of the gas field. Yamburg is a company town, and the vast majority of its 5,000–6,000 inhabitants are employees of Gazprom.  The settlement is well served by transport infrastructure, including an airport, as well as river, motor and railway connections to other points in Russia.

References

Rural localities in Yamalo-Nenets Autonomous Okrug